The  is the 37th edition of the Japan Academy Film Prize, an award presented by the Nippon Academy-Sho Association to award excellence in filmmaking. It awarded the best films of 2013 and it took place on March 7, 2014 at the Grand Prince Hotel New Takanawa in Tokyo, Japan.

Nominees

Awards

Films with multiple nominations 
The following films received multiple nominations:
Note: Incomplete.

References

External links 
  - 

Japan Academy Film Prize
2014 in Japanese cinema
Japan Academy Film Prize
March 2014 events in Japan